Sonna Puriyathu is a 2013 Indian Tamil comedy film directed by debutant Krishnan Jayaraj, a former associate of C. S. Amudhan It stars Shiva and Vasundhara. The film released on 26 July 2013. The film got a good opening and finally declared as an above average hit in the boxoffice. The film's title is based on a song from Velayudham (2011).

Plot
Shiva is a dubbing artist and a person who is not happy with love and marriages. His dream is to buy a Volkswagen car for himself. But his mother forces him by blackmailing him to marry and he finally accepts without satisfaction. The girl is Anjali who is revealed to be a devotional girl and is a press reporter. When the marriage of one of Shiva's friends takes place, both Anjali and Shiva are invited. Anjali is invited because the friend was forced by Shiva in order to stop their marriage. But in that marriage, Shiva gets to know that Anjali is the exact opposite of what he thought she was, and that Anjali herself wanted to stop their marriage. They finally break up and they make their parents also accept (Shiva lied to Anjali's father that he became impotent during a cricket match and Anjali cooks up a plot claiming that she became pregnant).

Shiva and Anjali celebrate their marriage cancellation in a pub. The next day, they found themselves in a hotel room together. Shiva and Anjali suspects that Shiva friend Gowri did the arrangement but after review the CCTV footage it is revealed that a Seth guy did the arrangement. Shiva and Anjali solve the matter and go to Anjali's house to drop her. Anjali's father prepared marriage with Anjali co-worker. A few days later the broker Rajesh Kanna, who helped Shiva's mother, visits them with the news that they are going to organize a game show. The prize money from the game show will help Shiva to achieve his longtime dream. In the game, Shiva and Anjali win all the rounds. Anjali started falling in love with Shiva. Anjali feels sad when she learns that Shiva participated in the game only to win Volkswagen car and breaks up with him. With the insistence of his friends, Shiva realises Anjali's love. In order to unite with Anjali, Shiva set up a plan by making a stage actress to act as bride to marry so that Anjali would marry him. Rajesh Kanna who learns of Shiva's plan kidnaps Shiva. Later he leaves Shiva when he claims that Anjali is going to marry someone. When Siva arrives at register office. He sees Anjali getting married. Saddened, Shiva goes to a park and he witnesses a flash mob dancing towards him. It is revealed that it was Anjali's plan to surprise Shiva whereas his friend was also involved in this plan. Shiva and Anjali get married and live happily.

Cast

 Shiva as Shiva
 Vasundhara Kashyap as Anjali
 Blade Shankar as Shiva's friend
 Pradeep K Vijayan as Bimbo
 Jacqueline as Shwetha
 Jangiri Madhumitha
 R. S. Shivaji as Anjali's father
 Manobala as Rajesh Khanna
 Gangai Amaran as TV show host
 Meera Krishnan as Shiva's mother
 Aarthi
 Vatsala Rajagopal as Shiva's grandmother
 Singamuthu as Naattamai
 Rajini Nivetha as Sharmilla Tagore
 Raghav as Settu Paiyan
 Saravanan
 Halwa Vasu
 Shyamili Sukumar
 Sam Anderson as himself (cameo)

Production

Shiva will be seen in the role of dubbing artist who dubs for Tamil dubbed Hollywood movies and he plays a character who is scared of marrying. Sam Anderson who is best known for Yaaruku Yaaro made a cameo appearance. The film was shot extensively in Chennai and Gobichettipalayam.

Soundtrack

Music is composed by Yathish Mahadev who earlier composed for Indira Vizha. Lyrics were written by Na Muthukumar and Madhan Karky. Shiva wrote the lyrics for the film's Hindi number Rosa Heh, in 20 minutes time, and sang it in 10 minutes. The song was not included in the audio CD. The audio was released on 9 January 2013. Behindwoods wrote:"Sonna Puriyadhu's music is simple and to the point".

 "Kelu Magane Kelu" - Jagadeesh Kumar
 "Kaaliyana Saalaiyil" - S. P. B. Charan, Chinmayi
 "Devathaya Rakshasiya" - Ranjith
 "Un Tholil Saindhu" - M. K. Balaji
 "Ayyayo Poche" - M. .K Balaji, Yatish
 "Sonna Puriyathu" - Theme music
 "Sagaroo" - Instrumental
 "Dance To It" - Instrumental

Marketing
Posters where Shiva mocking James Bond, Titanic, Harry Potter were released in 2012.

Release
The satellite rights of the film were secured by Kalaignar TV. The film's distribution rights were initially purchased by Studio Green, but later acquired by Sri Thenandal Films.

Reception
Sonna Puriyathu received mixed reviews from critics. The New Indian Express said, "Mildly amusing and a promising work by a debutant, Sonna Puriyathu could have done with more punch in its screenplay". The Hindu showered accolades on the movie with the editor Sudhish Kamath giving the movie a 7/10 in his Twitter account and called everything is right about the movie, citing that "A breezy anti-romance comedy that works as a Tamizh Padam spin off with enough laughs to merit a watch.".
Indiaglitz.Com rated 2.75/5 and gives a verdict that "One word – Shiva, he rocks, sizzles throughout his screen presence with a volley of one liner and gimmicks. MetroMasti.Com rated 3/5 and with a verdict "Sonna Puriyathu proves to be a comic caper and entertains audience as well. Shiva is perfect with his comedy timings as ever and Vasundhara is back with a perfect role after Poraali and has done full justice to it." The movie is running to packed houses with increased shows in metropolitan cities like Chennai, Bangalore garnering more positive reviews from the audiences saying this is the best performance Shiva has ever done." Times of India gave 3 stars for this movie.

References

External links
 

2013 films
2010s Tamil-language films
Indian romantic comedy films
2013 directorial debut films
2013 romantic comedy films
Films scored by Yatish Mahadev